In marketing, value migration is the shifting of value-creating forces. Value migrates from outmoded business models to business designs that are better able to satisfy customers' priorities. Marketing strategy is the art of creating value for the customer. This can only be done by offering a product or service that corresponds to customer needs. In a fast changing business environment, the factors that determine value are constantly changing.

See also
 Business models
 Competitive advantage
 Core competency
 Marketing
 Strategic management

References

Value proposition